Zawisza Kurozwęcki, Zawisza Dobiesław z Kurozwęk (?–12 January 1382), of Clan Poraj, was a Polish regent of the Kingdom of Poland, Roman Catholic bishop of Kraków, Chancellor of the Crown (kanclerz koronny) and Deputy Chancellor of the Crown (podkanclerzy koronny) of the Kingdom of Poland, prominent politician.

Biography
Date and place of birth of Zawisza remain unknown.

In the years of 1352–1353 Zawisza was a canon of Sandomierz, 1353–1380 canon of Kraków and since 1366 archdeacon of Kraków. Since 1380 or since 1381 (sources vary) bishop of Kraków. In the years of 1371–1373 Zawisza was a Deputy Chancellor of the Crown and in the years of 1374–1380 Chancellor of the Crown of the Kingdom of Poland. In 1381 Zawisza became a Vicarius regni poloniae.

He died on 12 January 1382 in Dobrowoda, Świętokrzyskie Voivodeship, Poland.

Family
 Dobiesław Kurozwęcki (?–1397) – father; castellan, politician
 Krzesław Kurozwęcki (?–1392) – brother; nobility

References

Further reading 
Robert  Bubczyk: Kariera rodziny Kurozwęckich  w XIV wieku. Studium z  dziejów powiązań polskiej elity politycznej z Andegawenami,  Wydawnictwo DiG, Warszawa 2002

1382 deaths
Bishops of Kraków
Regents of Poland
Year of birth unknown
Clan of Poraj
14th-century Polish nobility
Crown Vice-Chancellors